Tamil cinema refers to the film industry dedicated to production of films in the Tamil language, based in the Indian city of Chennai.

Tamil cinema can also refer to other Tamil filmmaking industries in other parts of the world.
 Sri Lankan Tamil cinema
 List of Sri Lankan Tamil films
Malaysian Tamil cinema
Tamil cinema and Dravidian politics, regional politics in India

See also 
Pride of Tamil Cinema, book on Indian cinema by G. Dhananjayan
Vijay Award for Contribution to Tamil Cinema, Indian award for excellence in cinematic arts
S. S. Vasan, Indian filmmaker known as the "Cecil B. DeMille of Tamil cinema"